Andrew Victor Barsalona (born 3 August 1990) is a Canadian soccer player who plays as a midfielder for German club 1860 Rosenheim.

Career

Before the second half of 2011-12, Barsalona signed for German fifth division side Eintracht Braunschweig II. After that, he signed for Germania Halberstadt II in the German sixth division. In 2014, Barsalona signed for Finnish top flight club VPS, where he made 2 league appearances and scored 0 goals. On 14 September 2014, he debuted for VPS during a 3-3 draw with Jaro. In 2018, he signed for Unión Puerto in Spain. In 2020, Barsalona signed for German team Brandenburger SC Süd 05. In 2021, he signed for FC Mauerwerk in Austria.

References

External links
 
 Andrew Barsalona at playmakerstats.com

1990 births
Soccer players from Toronto
Living people
Canadian soccer players
Association football midfielders

UAB Blazers men's soccer players
K-W United FC players
Eintracht Braunschweig II players
Vaasan Palloseura players
Knattspyrnufélagið Þróttur players
Brandenburger SC Süd 05 players
FC Mauerwerk players
TSV 1860 Rosenheim players
Oberliga (football) players
Veikkausliiga players
Austrian Regionalliga players
Bayernliga players
Canadian expatriate soccer players
Expatriate soccer players in the United States
Canadian expatriate sportspeople in the United States
Expatriate footballers in Germany
Canadian expatriate sportspeople in Germany
Expatriate footballers in Finland
Canadian expatriate sportspeople in Finland
Expatriate footballers in Iceland
Canadian expatriate sportspeople in Iceland
Expatriate footballers in Spain
Canadian expatriate sportspeople in Spain
Expatriate footballers in Austria
Canadian expatriate sportspeople in Austria